The Tolleson Union High School District is a high school district in the city of Tolleson, Arizona. Portions of Glendale, far west Phoenix and Avondale are zoned into this district.

Schools

By 2018 construction began on another high school in Avondale, scheduled to open in 2021.

References

School districts in Maricopa County, Arizona
1927 establishments in Arizona
School districts established in 1927